Revés/Yo Soy (English: Backwards/I Am) is the fourth album by the Mexican rock band Café Tacuba, released in 1999. In fact, it is two albums—Revés is an instrumental album, Yo Soy a collection of songs the band had been saving up since their second album, Re. 

It was nominated for a Grammy Award, in the "Best Latin Rock/Alternative Performance" category. It won the Latin Grammy Award for "Best Rock Album".

Critical reception
The New York Times wrote: "Many of the Spanish lyrics are about isolation and disorientation: as most great bands do three or four albums into a career, Cafe Tacuba has made a record about entering one's 30s and wondering what the next step is."

In a retrospective article, the Chicago Tribune called the album a "masterpiece," writing that it "matched offbeat Eno-meets-Esquivel instrumentals with slightly more conventional rock songs."

Track listing

Personnel
 Ñru (Rubén Albarrán) – vocals (except 4, 7, 12, 15), guitar
 Emmanuel del Real – keyboards, acoustic guitar, piano, programming, vocals (4, 7), melodeon, drum machine
 Joselo Rangel – electric guitar, acoustic guitar, vocals (15)
 Quique Rangel – bass guitar, electric upright bass, vocals (12)

References

1999 albums
Café Tacuba albums
Latin Grammy Award for Best Rock Album